Burja or Boorja is a village in Srikakulam district of the Indian state of Andhra Pradesh.
Burja is located near River Nagavali.

Burja mandal is bordered by Regidi Amadalavalasa, Santhakavati, Palakonda, Seethampeta, Sarubujjili and Amadalavalasa mandals of Srikakulam district.

Narayanapuram project
The Narayanapuram Ayacut Project was constructed across the Nagavali River.

References 

Villages in Srikakulam district
Mandal headquarters in Srikakulam district